Carcassonne Castle is a residence in Marblehead, Massachusetts, United States. It was completed in 1935 for Aroline Gove, daughter of Lydia Pinkham. During the 1970s and 80s it was owned by George A. Butler, who held glitzy parties in the three-story, 23-room granite castle.

Construction
Construction on Carcassonne took place during The Great Depression. Granite was hauled from the South Shore, wood was imported from Australia, Mexico, Venezuela, and Africa, and marble was brought in from around the world. The cost of construction was $500,000. Gove received a commendation from President Franklin Delano Roosevelt for putting many unemployed craftsmen to work. Carcassonne was built by Gourdeau Construction Co. of Hamilton, Massachusetts.

Layout
Carcassonne has a tri-level symmetrical floor plan designed around a central circular tower. It has 23 rooms and 11 baths, almost all of them have an ocean view. It includes seven fireplaces and a salt-water pool. It is located on 2.5 acres, which includes 307 feet of ocean beachfront. Gove purchased 25,000 plants for the landscaping, however she insisted on not planting any high shrubbery or trees in order not to obstruct the public's view of the Carcassonne or the ocean.

Owners

Guido Rugo
Gove died in 1939 and Carcassonne was inherited by her daughter, Lydia Pinkham Gove. On August 15, 1949, Guido Rugo purchased Carcassonne from the estate of Lydia Pinkham Gove for $50,000. In 1954, the Rugos hosted 500 guests for Archbishop Richard J. Cushing's 59th birthday.
In 1964, the Rugos sold the house to attorney Robert J. DiGiacomo and his wife who sold it in 1966 to James Zografos, who sold it to Butler in 1973.

George A. Butler
In 1972, George A. Butler, the New England distributor of Toyota automobiles, purchased Carcassonne. He decorated the castle with a number of unique objects, including a jewelry case made out of an ostrich egg, an impala skeleton, and a painting of Muhammad Ali inscribed by the boxer. Butler also had a private helipad, a small theater, and four tiers of gardens. Butler hosted a number of benefit parties at Carcassonne for the Boston Children's Hospital and his other favorite charities. Carcassonne's annual benefit for the Boys & Girls Clubs of Boston, known as "Pique-Nique au Bord de Mer" (picnic by the sea), drew a number of famous guests, including Joan Kennedy, John Havlicek, Mike Eruzione, Francis X. Bellotti, Frank Avruch, Tom Ellis, Don Gillis, and Thomas P. O'Neill III. Peter Duchin performed at the 1980 event. He also hosted fundraisers for the Massachusetts Democratic Party. Butler sold Carcassonne in 1982. He stated that he decided to sell the home because its dampness aggravated his asthma and its small windows obstructed his view of the ocean. Butler and his wife moved into smaller home three doors down from Carcassonne.

Later ownership
Condominium developer William Lilly purchased Carcassonne from Butler for $1 million. In 1991, the property was foreclosed on by 1st American Bank for Savings. It was sold by the Federal Deposit Insurance Corporation at a sealed-bid auction. The minimum bid was $1.53 million. At the time, Carcassonne was assessed at $3.4 million. In 1992, Carcassonne's new owners, the Gianatasio family, gave the mansion an extensive makeover.

References

Castles in Massachusetts
Houses completed in 1935
Houses in Marblehead, Massachusetts